Love By Chance is a romantic comedy Indian television series that presents dramatizations of love stories. It showcases stories of people who have found love through serendipity.

Every week the show takes the audience through love stories with actor and stand-up comedian, Kavi Shastri.

Host 
Kavi Shastri (all episode)

Episodes

References 

Bindass original programming
2014 Indian television series debuts
2015 Indian television series endings
Indian romance television series
Indian anthology television series